Corfinio is a comune (municipality) and town in the province of L'Aquila in the Abruzzo region of Italy.

In the Middle Ages, Roman Corfinium was known as Valva, and was the seat of a bishopric. This name is preserved in the name of the united diocese of Sulmona-Valva.

References

See also
Museo civico archeologico Antonio De Nino